Henry Draper (12 February 1847 – 31 December 1896) was a cricket test match umpire, standing in the 1893 Ashes test at the Oval.  Born in Kent in 1847, he died in 1896.

References

1847 births
English Test cricket umpires
1896 deaths
People from Penshurst